Andrew Supanz (born 1982 in Perth, Western Australia) is an Australian actor. He is best known for playing Dr. Bartholomew "Bart" West (often referred as Homer by other doctors on the show) on the series All Saints from 2006 until the final episode in 2009.

Supanz grew up in Noranda, Western Australia and attended Morley Senior High School. After completion of grade 12, he went on to graduate from Curtin University of Technology in 2003 with a double major in Acting and Creative Writing. After graduating from Curtin, Supanz was accepted into the National Institute of Dramatic Art and so then moved to Sydney. After completing the NIDA course in November 2005, Supanz landed his first role as Doctor Bart West in All Saints. In 2007, Supanz was nominated for a Logie Award for Most Popular New Talent (Male).

He also starred in a television commercial advertising Libra tampons.

References

External links 

All Saints biography
 Andrew Supanz

Living people
Australian male television actors
Male actors from Perth, Western Australia
1982 births
Curtin University alumni
21st-century Australian male actors